Lúnasa is an album by Lúnasa that was released twice, first in 1998 on their own label, and again in 2001 on Compass Records. It was the band's first major release. The piping on the album was done by John McSherry, as Cillian Vallely was not part of the group at the time.

The first release of the album contained eleven tracks, named for the months in the Irish calendar. 'Lúnasa', the word for August, was omitted.
A twelfth track was added for the re-release.

Wayne Sheehy of Hothouse Flowers is a fan of the album, once commenting that he "loves" it.

Track listing
 Eanáir(Lord Mayo, Gavotte, The Maids Of Mt. Cisco)
 Feabhra(An Erc'h War An Enezeg (Snow On The Island), Brenda Stubbert's, Thunderhead)
 Márta(The Noonday Feast, The Waterbed, Sully's No. 6)
 Aibreann(The Last Pint)
 Bealtaine(Hogties, Promenade, Gan Ainm)
 Meitheamh(Fleur De Mandragore, The Ashplant, Siobhan O'Donnell's)
 Iúil(Frailock)
 Meán Fómhair(Colonel Frazer)
 Deireadh Fómhair(Terry 'Cuz' Teehan's, Alice's)
 Mí Na Samhna(Jizaique, Baby Rory's, Dub)
 Mí Na Nollag(The Kerfuntan, Eddie Kelly's, Give Us A Drink Of Water)
 Jacky Molard's / The Hunter's Purse (live recording) (bonus track on 2001 version)

Personnel
Michael McGoldrick – flute, low whistle
John McSherry – low whistle, uillean pipes
Donogh Hennessy – guitar
Seán Smyth – fiddle, swanee (slide whistle)
Trevor Hutchinson – double bass, mixing
Joe Chester – mixing
Aiden Foley – mastering
Earle Hitchner – liner Notes
Naoimh Ingram – cover design
Griffin Norman – packaging

References

External links
 Lúnasa's website

Lúnasa (band) albums
1998 live albums
Compass Records albums